was a town located in Shimotsuga District, Tochigi Prefecture, Japan.

As of 2003, the town had an estimated population of 13,635 and a density of 446.76 persons per km². The total area was 30.52 km².

On March 29, 2010, Tsuga, along with the towns of Fujioka and Ōhira (all from Shimotsuga District), was merged into the expanded city of Tochigi.

External links
 Tochigi official website 

Dissolved municipalities of Tochigi Prefecture